Georgios Pamlidis (born 13 November 1993) is a Greek professional footballer who plays as a forward for Super League club PAS Giannina.

Career

Thermaikos Korinos 
Pamlidis started his career from a local amateur team from Pieria, Thermaikos of Korinos.

Achilleas Neokaisareia 
On 28 August 2013, he signed for Footaball League 2 club Achilleas Neokaisareia.

Ergotelis 
After 1 year, he gained the attention of Super League club Ergotelis and, within a month's trial, he signed a 5-years contract with the Cretan team.

Loan to AEL 
On 30 January 2015, he was given on loan to AEL till the end of the 2014–15 season.

Kerkyra 
On 28 December 2015, Pamlidis reportedly signed for Football League side Kerkyra, after legally filing for his contract with Ergotelis to be terminated, due to unpaid wages. He was officially announced by Kerkyra on 7 January 2016.

Apollon Smyrnis
On 5 July 2021, Greek Super League club Apollon Smyrnis announced Pamlidis had signed a contract with the club, with the duration of the contract and the shirt number not being disclosed.

Career statistics

Honours
PAS Giannina
 Super League Greece 2: 2019–20

Individual
 Top Scorer of Greek Football Cup: 2019–20

References

External links
 gazzetta.gr
 superleaguegreece.net

1993 births
Living people
Footballers from Katerini
Greek footballers
Super League Greece players
Football League (Greece) players
Super League Greece 2 players
Gamma Ethniki players
Achilleas Neokaisareia F.C. players
Ergotelis F.C. players
Athlitiki Enosi Larissa F.C. players
PAE Kerkyra players
PAS Giannina F.C. players
Apollon Smyrnis F.C. players
Association football forwards